The Daewoo Precision Industries K1/K1A is a South Korean selective-fire assault rifle developed by Agency for Defense Development (ADD) and manufactured by Daewoo Precision Industries (now S&T Motiv) and Dasan Machineries (since 2016). It entered service in the Republic of Korea Armed Forces in 1981. Although the K1 uses .223 Remington, it is classified as a submachine gun by the South Korean military and the manufacturer, because the K1 was intended to replace the M3 submachine gun.

Development

In 1976, the ROKA Special Warfare Command requested a new weapon to replace the old M3 submachine gun. In the following year, ADD launched a project derived from the XB rifle, which started in 1972 to replace licensed M16A1s with indigenous weapons. Under the demands of the ROKASWC, the new submachine gun must acquire greater firepower, light weight, cost effectiveness, and easy access to spare parts. The first prototypes were made in 1980, and entered service in 1981 after series of field test.

But due to the design of its flash suppressor, the K1 exhibited serious problems in service with the ROK armed forces. The original version had excessive recoil, noise, flash, and weak stock due to increase in firepower. These problems caused difficulty in aiming especially during night operation.

These shortcomings were later fixed by the development and adoption of a new flash suppressor, which has three holes in the top right quadrant to limit muzzle flip under rapid fire and reduces flash to one-third of that of the early K1. This new version of K1 is known as the K1A and its production began in 1982. All K1 submachine guns in service were subsequently modified to the K1A standard.

The K1A is often mated with the PVS-4K rail integration System. It is seen as a potential candidate for the "Warrior Platform", a Korean next-generation infantry project.

Since 2014, newly produced and repaired K1A received new barrel suited for firing 5.56x45mm NATO ammunition.

Differences
Most of the time, K1 submachine gun is regarded as a shortened or carbine version of Daewoo Precision Industries K2 assault rifle. However, although the two guns share development history they are very different from each other for the following reasons:
 The development of K1 was completed earlier than that of K2.
 The K1 uses the direct impingement gas system, while the K2 uses AK-47 style gas piston system.
 The K1 has 1-in-12 rifling twist for .223 Remington, while the K2 has 1-in-7.3 rifling twist for 5.56×45mm NATO.
The carbine version of K2 named K2C was developed and shown to the public in 2012 by S&T Motiv.

Variants
 XK1: Experimental prototype.
 K1: First mass-produced variant. Every K1 has been modified to K1A standard.
 K1A: Second mass-produced enhanced variant.
 MAX-1: Semi-automatic version of K1A for civilian market for .223 Remington.
 K1A1: Civilian version of K1A with longer barrel for 5.56x45mm NATO.

Users

: Used by Special Forces Command (Cambodia) 137 K1As sold.
: Standard-issued submachine gun of the ROK Armed Forces. Will be replaced by K16 submachine gun.

: Received 280 K1A rifles in 2003.
: 855 K1As sold to Singapore from a SIPRI small arms report in 2019.

Future replacement
The S&T Motiv K2C, an upgraded carbine version of the K2 rifle, was provided to the Republic of Korea Army Special Warfare Command for trial. After a series of tests, K2C was rejected. Instead, the Republic of Korea Armed Forces launched a competition for replacing K1A with new rifle.

On 13 June 2020, the Republic of Korea Army Special Warfare Command announced that the DSAR15PC had been selected as its new service carbine to replace the K1A carbine. The DSAR15P is based on the CAR 816 and other AR-15 platforms, with the carbine version having an  barrel and weighing . 1,000 carbines will initially be delivered to gather user feedback, with 15,000 to be delivered by 2023.

See also
 M3 submachine gun: used prior to and replaced by K1A
 Daewoo Precision Industries K2: related development
 Daewoo Precision Industries K7: 9×19 Parabellum submachine gun with permanent silencer based on K1A
 S&T Motiv K2C: proposed replacement, rejected after field test
 S&T Motiv STC-16: proposed replacement, rejected after competing against DSAR15PC (K16)
 Dasan Machineries K16: selected winner for replacement of K1A used by the ROKASWC.

References

External links

 K1 through K7 images
 S&T Daewoo Homepage

5.56 mm assault rifles
Post–Cold War weapons of South Korea
Daewoo assault rifles
Military equipment introduced in the 1980s